Events from the year 1690 in Denmark

Incumbents
 Monarch – Christian V

Events
 9 April – Christian V approves the creation of Nyholm as a new home for Royal Dockyard.
 24 June – Riots between sailors and soldiers break out in Copenhagen on Saint John's Eve.

Full date missing
 Kallebobro, the predecessor of Langebro, is completed in Copenhagen.

Births
 1 January – Christian Falster, poet and philologist (died 1752)
 17 January – Peter Schnitler, jurist and military officer (died 1751)

Full date missing
 Charlotte Helene von Schindel, lady in waiting and royal mistress (died 1752)

Deaths

Full date missing
 March – Bendix Grodtschillingm painter (born c. 1620)
 Ole Borch, scientist (born 1626)

References

 
Denmark
Years of the 17th century in Denmark